Mim Obaidullah (1932–2016) was a Bangladeshi politician affiliated with the Bangladesh Jamaat-e-Islami who served the Chapai Nawabganj-2 district as a member of the Jatiya Sangsad from 1986 to 1987.

Birth and early life 
Mim Obaidullah was born in 1933 in Rahonpura village of Nachol Upazila of Chapai Nawabganj district of Rajshahi Division.

Career 
Mim Obaidullah was elected to parliament from Chapai Nawabganj-2 as a Bangladesh Jamaat-e-Islami candidate in 1986. In 1987, he resigned from the parliament.

Death 
Mim Obaidullah died on 30 September 2016 in Rajshahi Medical College Hospital.

References

External links 
 List of 3rd Parliament Members - Jatiya Sangsad 

1932 births
2016 deaths
People from Chapai Nawabganj district
Bangladesh Jamaat-e-Islami politicians
3rd Jatiya Sangsad members